Hazzard was a German-British  heavy metal band formed by Herman Frank of Accept fame. The band featured Malcolm McNulty on vocals, who later joined Sweet as both bass player and vocalist and then Slade as Mal McNulty. Hazzard's only album release was mixed by Michael Wagener at Dierks Studios, Cologne. Herman Frank has also played in Victory and Sinner. He has worked as a record producer for Saxon and Rose Tattoo.

Personnel
 Herman Frank - Lead guitar
 Mal McNulty - Vocals
 Günter Sander - Rhythm guitar
 Wolfgang Hettmer - Bass
 Dieter Schmidt - Drums

Discography
Hazzard (1984 - Mausoleum Records)

References

British heavy metal musical groups
German heavy metal musical groups